The Ligovsky People's House was built in 1901–1903 at the expense of Countess Sofia Panina. It is located at the junction of Tambovskaya and Prilukskaya streets. It was one of a number of People's Houses created across Imperial Russia aimed at providing facilities for  making art and cultural appreciation available to the working classes. Similar projects also appeared across Europe. The building also contained a theatre.

Previous initiatives
Sofia Panina had been involved in a number of initiatives to support the local working class community: in1891, she had helped create a free children's canteen in rented premises was opened in the Alexander Nevsky District. Over the next decade this developed into a teahouse with a library and facilities for evening educational classes for adults and children. In 1901 she provided the land for the People's House and launched a petition to Saint Petersburg City Council for permission to build the current building. When permission was granted Julius Benois was engaged as the architect and the building was completed in 1903.

References

Buildings and structures completed in 1903
Buildings and structures in Saint Petersburg
Houses in Russia
Cultural heritage monuments of federal significance in Saint Petersburg